The locomotives TU10 (Russian TУ10) of the Russian Railways (RŽD) are narrow gauge diesel locomotives for children's railways.

History 
The children's railways or pioneer railways were used for extracurricular education, where adolescents learned railway professions. This phenomenon originated in the USSR and was greatly developed in Soviet times. However, existing children's railways continued to be used, and new tracks and locomotives were built even after the break-down of the Soviet Union.

Most of these railways operate diesel engines, but some of them occasionally fire up old steam locomotives. Some TU2 diesel locomotives from the 1950s are still being used, although most of them have been replaced by TU7 diesel locomotives or TU7A diesel locomotives. The production of narrow gauge locomotives was discontinued in the 2000s because of the demise in narrow gauge railways in Russia, such as forest railways, peat railways and industrial railways, and this led to a lack of suitable new or second-hand locomotives for the children's railways.

Development of the TU10 

The Kambarka Engineering Works began in 2008 with the development of a modern diesel locomotive especially for use at children's railways. Based on the experience with older models, the following innovations were implemented: The locomotives have two equal cabs with an ergonomically designed dash board and HVAC (heating, ventilation, air condition). They have a diesel engine JaMZ 6563.10 (ЯМЗ 6563.10) with 169 kW at 1900 rpm and a four gear hydraulic gear box of the Type D864.5 by Voith. The exhaust emissions are according to the Euro-3 standard. Apart from a computer assisted control and detection system they have also a KLUB-UP (КЛУБ-УП) train control system with GPS. The locomotives have a modern wireless communication system RVS-1-01 (РВС-1-01) and an automatic fire detection and extinguishing system.

The first prototype was unveiled in spring 2010, and delivered in August 2010 to St Petersburg. Most of the locomotives were painted in a variation to a common RŽD livery in the Russian national colours, with the exception of TU10-002 of Nowomoskowsk. So far 30 pieces of ТУ10 have been built (as of June 2015).

Use

The TU10 diesel locomotives are currently being used at the following railways:

External links 
 Тепловоз ТУ10 (Russian)

References

750 mm gauge locomotives
Diesel locomotives of the Soviet Union
Diesel locomotives of Russia